Kathleen R. Johnson is an American member of the Grand Traverse Band of Ottawa and Chippewa Indians who is a geologist and paleoclimatologist. Her research focuses on reconstructing past climate change with speleothems, on active cave monitoring to understand the interaction of climate with speleotherm geochemistry, and analyzes climate and paleoclimate data to investigate natural climate variability. She earned a PhD from the University of California Berkeley in 2004 and is an associate professor at the University of California Irvine.

Education 
Johnson earned her PhD in Geology from University of California, Berkeley with Lynn Ingram in 2004. She received her BS in Geological Sciences from the University of Michigan in 1992. After earning her PhD she was a post-doctoral research fellow at the University of Oxford from 2004-2007 with a Gary Comer Abrupt Climate Change Fellowship.

Career 
Johnson joined the faculty of the University of California Irvine in 2007, and is a tenured Associate Professor in the School of Physical Sciences. She leads the Johnson Lab in the Department of Earth System Science, with a focus on paleoclimate research. She is an expert in paleoclimate and hydrology, with research on the history of California droughts, Asian monsoons, and northern Mexico.

Johnson advocates for more Native American students to have careers in STEM, particularly geoscience, to address environmental challenges. Johnson was the Principal Investigator and director of the American Indian Summer Institute in Earth System Science, a residential summer program for high school students hosted at UC Irvine. The program was established in 2011 by Johnson and the American Indian Resource Program staff at UC Irvine with grant funding of more than $1M from the US National Science Foundation before ending in 2017. In 2016, the program had 129 participants from over 50 tribes. During the 2016 Bromery Award ceremony, she said: "...Native Americans are the most underrepresented of all ethnic minorities in the earth sciences....while I strongly value and love my paleoclimate and geochemistry research, I can truly say that it is my work with Native youth that has provided me with the most joy and hope for the future of our planet."

Awards and honors 

 Outstanding Contributions to Undergraduate Education, School of Physical Sciences, University of California Irvine, 2010 and 2012
 Chancellor’s Award for Excellence in Fostering Undergraduate Research, University of California Irvine, 2013
 Geological Society of America Bromery Award for Minorities, 2016
 Fellow of the Geological Society of America

Published works 
Johnson's Google Scholar page: https://scholar.google.com/citations?user=vhy8SzUAAAAJ&hl=en

References 

Year of birth missing (living people)
Living people
21st-century American women scientists
21st-century Native Americans
Fellows of the Geological Society of America
Native American academics
Native American scientists
Paleoclimatologists
Women geologists
21st-century Native American women
Native American women scientists